Arthur Henry Rosenkampff (November 3, 1884 – November 6, 1952) was an American gymnast and track and field athlete who competed in the 1904 Summer Olympics. In 1904 he won the silver medal in the team event. He was also 76th in gymnastics' triathlon event, 89th in gymnastics all-around event and 102nd in athletics' triathlon event.

References

External links
 profile

1884 births
1952 deaths
Gymnasts at the 1904 Summer Olympics
American male artistic gymnasts
Olympic silver medalists for the United States in gymnastics
Medalists at the 1904 Summer Olympics